Barry Lee Cort (born April 15, 1956) is a Canadian former pitcher for the Milwaukee Brewers. He was selected in the fourth round of the 1974 draft. He only played one year, 1977, at the major league level. He pitched in seven games, three of which he started. From 1978 to 1981, he played for various minor league teams in the Milwaukee and Oakland farm systems.

References

External links
Baseball Almanac biography
Baseball Reference statistics
Baseball Cube minor league statistics

1956 births
Baseball players from Toronto
Canadian expatriate baseball players in the United States
Living people
Major League Baseball players from Canada
Milwaukee Brewers players
West Haven A's players
Holyoke Millers players
Stockton Ports players
Spokane Indians players
Newark Co-Pilots players
Berkshire Brewers players
Burlington Bees players